Matt Barnes is an American soccer coach.

Barnes was inducted into the Judson Eagles' hall of fame. Barnes has as B.A. in Physical Education and General Science from Judson University, and a M.S. in Special Education from National University.

He played one season in the USISL in 1996 with the Rockford Raptors.

In August 2018, he was appointed as head coach of the Turks and Caicos national football team, while they were last placed in the FIFA rankings.

Barnes is currently the Sporting Director for Danish club FC Helsingør.

References 

Living people
Judson University alumni
National University (California) alumni
Turks and Caicos Islands national football team managers
1972 births
Expatriate football managers in the Turks and Caicos Islands
American soccer coaches